Garibaldi Alves Filho (born 4 February 1947) is a Brazilian politician and former President of the Federal Senate.

Filho was born in Natal, Rio Grande do Norte.  Prior to his appointment as President of the Senate, he served as a deputy to the Rio Grande do Norte Legislative Assembly for four legislative sessions (1971–1985), mayor of Natal (1986–1989), and governor of Rio Grande do Norte for two successive periods  (1995–2002). 
One of the main focuses of his governorship was water resources: he succeeded in providing an estimated 1 million people with a clean water supply and in reducing infant mortality by almost 60%.

He is a member of the Brazilian Democratic Movement Party (PMDB), prior to which he belonged to its predecessor, the MDB. His current Senate term (his second, having previously been elected for the 1991–98 period) runs until 2011. He was elected President of the Senate on 12 December 2007, with 68 votes for, eight against, and two abstentions. He served as the President of Senate until 2009.

Garibaldi Alves Filho served the Minister of Social Welfare from 2011 to 2015.

See also
 List of mayors of Natal, Rio Grande do Norte

References

External links
Garibaldi Alves Filho: as Senator
Garibaldi Alves Filho: as Senate President

Presidents of the Federal Senate (Brazil)
1947 births
Living people
People from Natal, Rio Grande do Norte
Brazilian Democratic Movement politicians
Mayors of Natal, Rio Grande do Norte
Members of the Legislative Assembly of Rio Grande do Norte
Government ministers of Brazil